Lev Skrbenský z Hříště, also spelt Skrebensky (12 June 1863, Hausdorf (now a part of Bartošovice), Moravia, Austria-Hungary – 24 December 1938, Dlouhá Loučka, Czechoslovakia) was a prominent Cardinal in the Catholic Church during the early 20th century.

Born into a wealthy family, Lev Skrbenský z Hříště was educated at the seminary of Olomouc and during the 1880s worked on a doctorate in canon law at the Pontifical Gregorian University. During his stay in Rome he lived in the priest college Santa Maria dell'Anima and served there as a chaplain too. After being ordained in 1889, he went into the army of the Austrian Empire and spent the following decade serving as an army chaplain.

He left his military duties in 1899, and Emperor Franz Joseph I of Austria selected him as Archbishop of Prague. Two years later, he was made a cardinal on 15 April 1901, at the age of thirty-seven. He received the red hat on 9 June 1902. Later that year, Lev (together with other Bohemian and Moravian bishops) was addressed in pope Leo's encyclical Quae Ad Nos. He participated in the 1903 and 1914 conclaves, and in 1916 was transferred to the see of Olomouc, to which he was elected by its cathedral chapter at the request of the Habsburg government. He resigned this see in 1920 due to poor health and did not participate in the 1922 conclave.

Although his health remained very poor, Skrbenský z Hříště lived until 1938 and was the last cardinal created by Pope Leo XIII to die, outliving Vincenzo Vannutelli by more than eight years.

Notes

References

External links
record at Catholic Hierarchy 

1863 births
1938 deaths
Czech cardinals
Cardinals created by Pope Leo XIII
Archbishops of Olomouc
Roman Catholic archbishops of Prague
20th-century Roman Catholic archbishops in Austria-Hungary
Burials at Saint Wenceslas Cathedral
Roman Catholic archbishops in Czechoslovakia
Bohemian nobility
Moravian nobility
People from Nový Jičín District
Czech archbishops